Sant'Agnese a Vignano is a Renaissance-style, Roman Catholic church located in the village of Vignano just outside the walls of the city of Siena, region of Tuscany, Italy. It is part of the archdiocese of Siena-Colle of Val d'Elsa-Montalcino.

History
A church at the site is mentioned in 1175, but underwent reconstruction in later centuries. Again restored in 1910 and 1930. The church contains an altarpiece depicting a Madonna and Child by Bartolo di Fredi; a 20th-century statue of Santa Agnese by Fulvio Corsini; and a work by the sculptor Tommaso Redi. The inventory from 1840 also noted altarpieces by Astolfo Petrazzi (San Domenico) and Giuseppe Nicola Nasini (Madonna del Rosario).

References

Roman Catholic churches in Siena
Renaissance architecture in Siena